Carex depauperata (starved wood-sedge) is a rare species of sedge native to parts of Europe. The plant has been virtually extinct in the United Kingdom since the 1940s.

In 2010, following a successful reintroduction at Charterhouse School, staff at Wakehurst Place Garden, West Sussex, announced that the plant was to be reintroduced to a second, undisclosed location in Surrey.

References

External links

depauperata
Flora of Europe
Flora of temperate Asia
Plants described in 1787